Sanschagrin is a surname. Notable people with the surname include:

Albert Sanschagrin (1911–2009), Canadian Roman Catholic bishop
Joceline Sanschagrin (born 1950), Canadian writer